GMA Regional TV Early Edition  is a Philippine television news broadcasting show broadcast by GMA Bacolod and GMA Iloilo. Originally hosted by Atty. Sedfrey Cabaluna, Kaitlene Rivilla and Adrian Prietos, it premiered on August 31, 2020. Adrian Prietos, and Kaitlene Rivilla currently serve as hosts.

Overview
The program is the second unified morning show in Western Visayas, more than five years after its predecessor Arangkada (Ang Trip Mo Kung Aga) went off the air following the strategic streamlining of programs and manpower on GMA's provincial stations.

GMA Regional TV Early Edition broadcasts live from the  GMA Channels 13 and 30 Bacolod Studios in Bacolod City and GMA Channel 6 Iloilo Complex in Iloilo City and is simulcast in GMA Roxas (Channel 5), GMA Kalibo (Channel 2) and GMA Sipalay (Channel 10).

Starting February 6, 2023, the program shifted from a pre-recorded presentation to a live broadcast as part of the rebranding of GMA Regional TV, integrating news reports alongside interviews with personalities all over Western Visayas.

Segments
 Spotlight
 BizTalk 
 Unang Balita
 GMA Integrated News Weather Center
 Namit Gid Express
 Nabal-an Mo Na? (formerly Kabalo Na Kamo?)
 Binag-Binag

Hosts

Current
 Adrian Prietos  - Main Host
 Kaitlene Rivilla  - Co-Host

Former
 Atty.  Sedfrey Cabaluna

References

External links
 

2020 Philippine television series debuts
GMA Network news shows
GMA Integrated News and Public Affairs shows
Philippine television news shows
Television in Iloilo City